Blackface Mountain is a summit in Alberta, Canada.

Blackface Mountain most likely was so named on account of its appearance.

References

Two-thousanders of Alberta
Alberta's Rockies